Turtle Mountain is a provincial electoral district in the Canadian province of Manitoba. It was created with the westward expansion of the province's boundaries in 1881, eliminated by redistribution in 1968, and re-established in 1979, formally returned to the electoral map with the provincial election of 1981, was dissolved for the 2011 election and returned once again for the 2019 Manitoba general election.

Turtle Mountain is located in the southwestern region of the province. It is bounded to the north by Ste. Rose, to the west by Minnedosa and Arthur-Virden, to the east by Pembina, Carman and Portage la Prairie, and south to the American state of North Dakota.

The riding is primarily rural. Communities in the riding included Killarney, Carberry, Glenboro, Pilot Mound and MacGregor.

The riding's population in 1996 was 18,569. In 1999, the average family income was $43,265, and the unemployment rate was 3.50%. Agriculture accounted for 37% of all industry in the riding, followed by health and social service work at 9%. Thirteen per cent of the riding's residents were German.

Turtle Mountain has been represented by the Progressive Conservative Party for most of its history, and is considered safe for that party. It was in Tory hands for all but six years after 1922 in its first incarnation, and has been held by the Tories at all times in its third incarnation.  The MLA prior to the 2019 Manitoba general election was Cliff Cullen, who was elected in a 2004 by-election.

Following the 2008 electoral redistribution, the riding was dissolved into the new ridings of Agassiz, Midland, and Spruce Woods. This change took effect for the 2011 election.  Cullen transferred to Spruce Woods.

Following the 2018 redistribution, Turtle Mountain will be re-created out of Arthur-Virden, Spruce Woods and Midland and will first be contested in the 2019 Manitoba general election. The riding will contain the municipalities of Two Borders, Melita, Grassland, Brenda-Waskada, Deloraine-Winchester, Boissevain-Morton (previously in Arthur-Virden), Prairie Lakes, Killarney - Turtle Mountain, Argyle, Cartwright-Roblin (previously in Spruce Woods) and Lorne, Swan Lake 7, Louise and Pembina (previously in Midland). As of the 2016 Census, 8,294 (36%) people were in the Arthur-Virden portion of the riding, 7,215 (31%) were in the Spruce Woods portion and 7,653 (33%) were in the Midland portion, for a total population of 23,612.

The riding is named for Turtle Mountain Provincial Park.

List of provincial representatives

Electoral results

1881 by-election

1883 general election

1886 general election

1888 general election

1892 general election

1896 general election

1897 by-election

1899 general election

1903 general election

1907 general election

1910 general election

1914 general election

1915 general election

1920 general election

1922 general election

1927 general election

1929 by-election

1932 general election

1936 general election

1941 general election

1945 general election

1949 general election

1953 general election

1958 general election

1959 general election

1959 by-election

1962 general election

1966 general election

1968 by-election

1981 general election

1986 general election

1988 general election

1990 general election

1995 general election

1999 general election

2003 general election

2004 by-election

2007 general election

2019 general election

References

Manitoba provincial electoral districts
1881 establishments in Manitoba
1979 establishments in Manitoba
1968 disestablishments in Manitoba
2011 disestablishments in Manitoba